The 2004 Pacific Life Pacific-10 Conference men's basketball tournament was played between March 11 and March 13, 2004, at Staples Center in Los Angeles, California. The Washington Huskies made their second trip to the final game (and their first since 1987) to play Stanford who was making their third finals appearance. The champion of the tournament was Stanford (who was also the Pac-10 regular season champion), which received the Pac-10's automatic bid to the NCAA tournament.   The Most Outstanding Player was Josh Childress of Stanford. The total attendance of 60,126 was the lowest since the tournament had been hosted at the Staples Center from 2002.

Seeds

The top eight Pacific-10 schools play in the tournament.  Teams are seeded by conference record, with a tiebreaker system used to seed teams with identical conference records.

Bracket

Tournament notes
 Stanford was the first 1 seed to win the tournament since Arizona had in 1989.
 This was also Stanford's first (and only) 1 seed in the Pac-10 Tournament and their only tournament championship.
 Upsets were all but non-existent in this tournament, with only the 5 seed beating the 4 seed in the first round.
 Oregon and Cal combined for 19 3-pt. field goals which set a then tournament record (13 and 6). This record would be later broken in 2012.
 Like the previous year, no teams met their arch-rival in this tournament.
 Washington State was in this tournament for the first time in 14 years, marking the longest drought of any conference team to participate.

All tournament team
 Josh Childress, Stanford – Tournament MVP
 Hassan Adams, Arizona
 Luke Jackson, Oregon
 Andre Joseph, Oregon
 Matt Lottich, Stanford
 Nate Robinson, Washington

References

2007–08 Pac-10 Men's Basketball Media Guide pages 50–60 (PDF copy available at 2007–08 Pac-10 Men's Basketball Media Guide)

2003–04 Pacific-10 Conference men's basketball season
Pac-12 Conference men's basketball tournament